Évenos is a commune in the Var department in the Provence-Alpes-Côte d'Azur region in southeastern France. It contains Cimaï, a 1 km long limestone cliff that is a popular rock climbing area and was one of the most important sites in the 1980s and 1990s in the development of sport climbing.

See also
Communes of the Var department

References

Communes of Var (department)